Duane Lee Underwood Jr. (born July 20, 1994) is an American professional baseball pitcher for the Pittsburgh Pirates of Major League Baseball (MLB). He has previously played in MLB for the Chicago Cubs.

Career

Amateur career
Underwood attended Alan C. Pope High School in Marietta, Georgia. He committed to play college baseball for the Georgia Bulldogs.

Chicago Cubs
The Chicago Cubs selected Underwood in the second round of the 2012 MLB draft. He signed with the Cubs, making his professional debut that same year with the Arizona League Cubs. He spent 2013 with the Boise Hawks and 2014 with the Kane County Cougars.  For 2015, Underwood was promoted to the Myrtle Beach Pelicans, where he posted a 2.58 earned run average (ERA) in  innings pitched. Underwood spent 2016 with the Tennessee Smokies, South Bend Cubs, and Myrtle Beach Pelicans, where he posted an 0–6 record with a 4.32 ERA. After the season, Underwood played for the Mesa Solar Sox of the Arizona Fall League and was added to the Cubs 40-man roster. He spent 2017 with the Tennessee Smokies where he went 13–7 with a 4.43 ERA and a 1.30 WHIP in 25 games.

Underwood started the 2018 season with the Iowa Cubs. On June 25, 2018, the Cubs promoted Underwood to the major leagues to make his first start against the Los Angeles Dodgers. He was optioned back to Iowa after the game, and spent the remainder of the year in Iowa. He returned to Iowa to begin 2019. He returned to the Chicago Cubs on August 6, 2019, and struck out all six batters he faced in his first appearance. Underwood appeared in 17 games for the Cubs in 2020 and pitched to a 5.66 ERA with 27 strikeouts in  innings pitched.

On March 2, 2021, Underwood was designated for assignment after the signing of Ryan Tepera was made official.

Pittsburgh Pirates
On March 7, 2021, the Cubs traded Underwood to the Pittsburgh Pirates in exchange for Shendrik Apostel. On September 6, Underwood was placed on the 60-day injured list with right shoulder inflammation.

On January 13, 2023, Underwood agreed to a one-year, $1.025 million contract with the Pirates, avoiding salary arbitration.

International career
During the 2023 World Baseball Classic (WBC), Underwood pitched for the Puerto Rico national team. On March 13, 2023, he pitched in relief versus Israel and retired every batter faced in the eighth inning, after José De León started and Yacksel Ríos, Edwin Díaz kept the perfect game intact, and Martín Maldonado caught on the way to a 10–0 win. The contest ended when Maldonado scored on a walk-off hit in the bottom of the eighth inning that invoked the tournament's mercy rule. However, it did not qualify as an official perfect game per the Elias Sports Bureau, due to lasting fewer than nine innings.

References

External links

1994 births
Living people
African-American baseball players
Arizona League Cubs players
Baseball players from Raleigh, North Carolina
Boise Hawks players
Chicago Cubs players
Criollos de Caguas players
Iowa Cubs players
Kane County Cougars players
Liga de Béisbol Profesional Roberto Clemente pitchers
Major League Baseball pitchers
Mesa Solar Sox players
Myrtle Beach Pelicans players
Pittsburgh Pirates players
South Bend Cubs players
Tennessee Smokies players
2023 World Baseball Classic players